General Robert K Kibochi, is a Kenyan military officer. From May 2020 to date, he is the Chief of Defence Forces (CDF) of the Kenya Defence Forces (KDF), the highest appointment in the Kenyan armed forces. He created history by becoming the first non-infantry officer from the Kenya Army to be appointed as CDF. Gen Kibochi belongs to the Corps of Signals, the military personnel responsible for conveying of information.

Background and Education
He was born in the Rift Valley of Gilgil, Nakuru, Nakuru County, in 1959. He attended Koelel High School http://www.koelelhigh.sc.ke/, in Gilgil and Nyeri High School, in Nyeri though he did not finish his A-Level Education as he opted for military recruitment and was enlisted.

In 1979, he joined the Kenya Army and was sent to the Armed Forces Training College (AFTC) in Nakuru, Kenya. After graduation, he was commissioned in the rank of Second Lieutenant and posted to Signals Battalion.
He has held various command and staff appointments including his immediate former appointment as Commander of the Kenya Army, Assistant Chief of Defence Forces in charge of Operations, Plans, Doctrine and Training at Defence Headquarters (DHQ), Chief of Strategic Plans and Policy, Director International Peace Support Training Centre, Colonel Operations Requirements (CIS) and Commander Corps of Signals. Other appointments held include Chief of Staff at the Eastern Africa Standby Force, SO1 Records at Headquarter Kenya Army (HQ KA), SO1 Comms HQ KA, SO1 Mobilization DHQ, SO1 Comms CIS DHQ and SOII Operations and Training at the HQ of the Corps of Signals.

Career & Education
Lt Gen Kibochi has achieved a BA (Hons) Degree in Technology and Communications. His other professional training includes National Security Studies at the National Defence College (Kenya), Army Command and Staff Course (UK), Overseas Telecoms Engineering Course (UK), Signal Officers Degree Telecommunications Engineering Course (India), Sub Unit Commanders Course, Platoon Commanders Course, Regimental Signal Officers Course among other training courses.

Other considerations
He served with the United Nations as Commander of Kenyan Contingent in the United Nations Mission in Sierra Leone (UNAMSIL) from 2000 – 2001; while his decorations include Moran of the Order of the Golden Heart (MGH) and Chief of the Order of the Burning Spear (CBS) among others.

See also
 Uhuru Kenyatta

References

Succession table

Personnel of the Kenya Army
Living people
20th-century births
Year of birth missing (living people)